The Subharchord is a synthesizer featuring subharmonic synthesis. It was developed in the mid-20th century by technicians in the German Democratic Republic.

Background
The first fully electronic compositions were written in Germany in the 1950s, influenced by musique concrète. In Germany, new music was composed and experiments conducted on electronic equipment that often came originally from physics labs or radio. Development in the German Democratic Republic (GDR) in the east and the Federal Republic of Germany (FRG) in the west differed considerably, as each state defined its own cultural policy.

One result was that young artists and musicians, who saw themselves as the avant-garde, were valued and tolerated differently in the two states; it was easier for musicians in the West to remain independent and experiment without interference. For example, at the Studio for Electronic Music at the Westdeutscher Rundfunk (WDR) in Cologne, many new works were written by composers such as Herbert Eimert, Karlheinz Stockhausen, and Gottfried Michael Koenig. The publications that came out of the WDR studio found an international audience. Experiments with musical structures and technical innovations were also taking place in studios in Milan, the Rome, Eindhoven, Brussels, Gravesano, and New York.

Invention 
These innovations in music, as well as the use of new electronic sources of sound, were followed with great interest in East Berlin, where the GDR wished to lead in the competitive struggle between the two German states. In around 1960, technical experts at the Labor für Akustisch-Musikalische Grenzprobleme began constructing a sound-generating device, which would be a compact sound lab and centerpiece of an electronic music studio, to give East German composers an instrument to work with that was technologically superior to the equipment available in the Western world.

The device utilized the nascent technology of microelectronics, and was based on the mixing of so-called subharmonic sounds. In this respect it was inspired by the Trautonium, a German invention from the 1930s.

Mixtur-trautonium 

A further development of the Trautonium was developed separately by Oskar Sala, called the Mixturtrautonium, a machine used to create the menacing sound of the birds in Alfred Hitchcock's film The Birds. Unlike all the other electronic instruments in use, the Mixtur-trautonium used subharmonic mixtures to generate sound. The sounds produced by conventional instruments and in the natural world are a combination of a fundamental with a series of harmonic overtones above it. Subharmonic sounds are produced by dividing the fundamental frequency, resulting in subharmonics, or "undertones", which only exist naturally in bells and steel plates, and differ from the sounds produced conventionally by synthesizers and software programmes for electronic music. Sala died without anyone else ever having learned to play the instrument he had built.

Rediscovery in 2000 
In 2000, while researching the history of electronic music instruments, Berlin artist and musician Manfred Miersch discovered the "Subharchord", another instrument which, like the Trautonium, produces subharmonic sounds. This instrument was invented in the GDR under difficult technical conditions, and differs from the Mixturtrautonium in key respects. The Subharchord has a keyboard and is played like an organ, whereas the Mixturtrautonium's manual is a resistor wire over a metal plate, which is pressed at various points to create sound, like a ribbon-controller. In addition, the Subharchord possesses considerably more possibilities than the Mixturtrautonium for generating and manipulating sounds.

Miersch's published his discovery in a four-part series in the German magazine Keyboards in 2003, and built a website to promote the Subharchord to a wider audience. One of the surviving instruments has now been restored.

Like its West German counterpart, the Trautonium, the East German Subharchord was used in several film soundtracks. , former conductor of the Symphony Orchestra of the DEFA film studio, worked with the subharchord in Dresden on the soundtracks of science fiction films including Signale. The subharchord was also used for many of DEFA's cartoons.

See also
 Subharmonic synthesizer
 Electroacoustic music

References
 
 Series of articles on German Keyboards magazine:

External links
 Subharchord.com
 Keyboards.de

Electronic musical instruments
German music